The Guntur–Krishna Canal section is a section of Indian Railways.

History 

Vijayawada to Guntur broad-gauge section was opened in 1966.

Jurisdiction 

References 

Rail transport in Andhra Pradesh

1966 establishments in Andhra Pradesh
Transport in Guntur
Transport in Vijayawada
Railway lines opened in 1966
5 ft 6 in gauge railways in India